Martunashen (Armenian for "town of Martuni") may refer to:
 Vanadzor, Armenia (known as Martunashen 1926–1935)
 Qarabulaq, Goygol, Azerbaijan
 Qaracallı, Qubadli, Azerbaijan